The Christians of Iraq are considered to be one of the oldest continuous Christian communities in the world. The vast majority of Iraqi Christians are indigenous Eastern Aramaic-speaking ethnic Assyrians who claim descent from ancient Assyria, and follow the Syriac Christian tradition. Some are also known by the name of their religious denomination as well as their ethnic identity, such as Chaldo-Assyrians, Chaldean Catholics or Syriacs (see Terms for Syriac Christians). Non-Assyrian Iraqi Christians are largely Arab Christians and Armenians, and a very small minority of Kurdish, Shabaks and Iraqi Turkmen Christians. Most present-day Iraqi Christians are ethnically, linguistically, historically and genetically distinct from Kurds, Arabs, Iranians, Turks and Turkmens (as well as from fellow Syriac Christians in Western Syria,  Lebanon, Jordan and South Western Turkey). Regardless of religious affiliation (Assyrian Church of the East, Chaldean Catholic Church, Syriac Orthodox Church, Syriac Catholic Church, Assyrian Pentecostal Church, etc.) the Eastern Aramaic speaking Christians of Iraq and it's surrounds are one genetically homogeneous people. They identify themselves as being a separate people, of different origins and with a distinct history of their own harking back to ancient Assyria and Mesopotamia (see Assyrian continuity and History of the Assyrians).  Christian Assyrians also have communities in northeastern Syria, southeastern Turkey, and northwestern Iran as well as in the wider worldwide Assyrian diaspora.

Syriac Christianity was first established in Mesopotamia, and certain subsets of that tradition (namely the Church of the East and its successor churches) were established in northern and central-southern Iraq, and would eventually spread to becoming one of the most popular Christian churches in the Middle East and Fertile Crescent Region, and would spread as far as India and China.

Iraq plays a rich and vital contribution to Christian history, and after Israel, Iraq has the most biblical history of any other country in the world. The patriarch Abraham was from Uruk, in southern Iraq, modern day Nasiriya, and Rebecca was from northwestern Iraq, in Assyria. Additionally, Daniel lived in Iraq most of his life. The prophet Ezekiel was from southern Iraq and his shrine is located there. Shrines of the prophet Jonah and Saint George are also located there, and various other biblical prophets and saints are said to have been originally from there as well. Adam and Eve are also widely thought to have hailed from Iraq, as the biblical Garden of Eden is largely attributed to have been located in southern Iraq.

Prior to the Gulf War in 1991, Christians numbered one million in Iraq. This may be an undercount by half as seen in the 1987 census numbers. The Ba’athist rule under Saddam Hussein kept anti-Christian violence under control but subjected some to "relocation programmes". Under this regime, the predominantly ethnically and linguistically distinct Assyrian people were pressured to identify as Arabs. The Christian population fell to an estimated 800,000 during the 2003 Iraq War.

During the 2013–2017 Iraq War, with ISIS rapidly sweeping through Iraq's western lands, Christian Assyrians and Armenians fled as they feared persecution by the terrorist organisation, as they were to ‘execute’ any person who did not believe in their Sunni sect. Thousands of Iraqi Christians fled to the nation's capital where they found refuge and adequate housing, some of whom have chosen to make Baghdad their new permanent home following the full defeat of ISIS in Iraq. Thousands have also fled to other parts of southern Iraq, such as the Shia-majority city of Najaf which housed thousands of Christians in holy Islamic shrines once they fled from ISIS, which sought to exterminate them. A large population have also returned to their homes en masse following the defeat of ISIS and were able to celebrate Christian festivals of Christmas and Easter in safety with the protection of the Assyrian Nineveh Plain Protection Units and its allies.

The current number of Christians of Iraq is said to be at around 500,000, according to the EU Research Services on minorities in Iraq, although numbers vary from source to source due to the last Iraqi census having taken place more than 30 years ago. A census is scheduled to take place in 2020 in which the numbers of Christians in Iraq will be clarified.

History

Early Church 
Christianity was brought to Iraq in the 1st century by Thomas the Apostle and Mar Addai (Addai of Edessa) and his pupils Aggai and Mari. Thomas and Addai belonged to the twelve Apostles. Iraq's Eastern Aramaic-speaking Assyrian communities are believed to be among the oldest in the world.

The Assyrian people adopted Christianity in the 1st century and Assyria in northern Iraq became the centre of Eastern Rite Christianity and Syriac literature from the 1st century until the Middle Ages. Christianity initially lived alongside the ancient Mesopotamian religion among the Assyrians, until the latter began to die out during the 4th century.

In the early centuries after the Arab Islamic conquest of the 7th century, Assyria (also known as Athura and Asoristan) was dissolved by the Arabs as a geopolitical entity, however the indigenous Assyrians (known as Ashuriyun by the Arabs) scholars and doctors played an influential role in Iraq.

Rise of Islam 
In the period prior to the establishment of Abbasid rule in AD 750, pastoral Kurds moved into upper Mesopotamia from Persian Azerbaijan, taking advantage of an unstable situation. Cities in northern and northeastern Assyria were raided and attacked by the Kurds of Persian Azerbaijan, "who killed, looted, and enslaved the indigenous population", and the Kurds were moving into various regions in east of Assyria. The chronicler Ibn Hawqal spoke about the state to which the region of Shahrazoor had been reduced, describing it as a “town, which was overpowered by the Kurds, and whose environs as far as Iraq had been enjoying prosperity”. Another contemporary source described the region of Adiabene thus: '[T]he plain of Hadyab was entirely inhabited by the Nestorians but the Kurds have occupied it and depopulated it of its inhabitants'.

Later, the Seljuks invaded Mesopotamia with the support of Kurdish chieftains and tribes. They "destroyed whatever they encountered" and captured and enslaved women. The historian Ibn Khaldun wrote that 'the Kurds spoiled and spread horror everywhere'. In time, Armenia and Assyria became "Kurdistan".

The Assyrian Church of the East has its origin in what is now southeastern Turkey and Asoristan (Sasanian Assyria). By the end of the 13th century, there were twelve Nestorian dioceses in a strip from Beijing to Samarkand. Northern Iraq remained predominantly Assyrian, Eastern Aramaic speaking and Christian until the destructions of the 14th-century Muslim warlord of Turco-Mongol descent, Timur (Tamerlane), who conquered Persia, Mesopotamia and Syria; the civilian population was decimated, and the ancient city of Assur was finally abandoned by the Assyrians after a 4000-year history. Timur had 70,000 Christian Assyrians beheaded in Tikrit, and 90,000 more in Baghdad. Timur rewarded the Kurds for their support by "settling them in the devastated regions, which until then had been inhabited by the followers of the Church of the East."

Ottoman rule 
In the 16th century, the Ottomans reinforced their eastern frontier with what they considered loyal Sunni Kurd tribes. They settled Kurdish tribes in these regions and in 1583, Sultan Murad III "gave huge provinces to the Kurdish tribe of Mokri". According to Aboona, "many regions with numerous Assyrian and Armenian monuments and monasteries became completely populated by the Kurds after Chaldiran," and Kurdish historians wrote that "the land was cleared at this time, its indigenous inhabitants driven out by force". The Kurdish historian Ali al Qurani affirmed that Sarsing had "been an Assyrian town and that the Kurds who settled there were immigrants from Persian Azerbaijan." Phebe Marr noted that 'in the north too, many of the Kurdish tribes of Persia migrated to Iraq'. British traveler James Rich observed in northern Iraq the "rapid influx of Kurds from Persia... and that their advance never ceased". He noted that "some ten thousand families, comprising seventy thousand souls, were constantly moving across the border". Southgate also observed the "rapid advance and settlement of the Kurds from Persia into northern Iraq" around that time. Dr. Grant gave an eyewitness account, he stated: "Beth Garrnae (the region of Arbil-Kirkuk) once contained a large population of Nestorian Christians, they are now reduced to a few scattered villages... Within the last six years the Koords of Ravandoos and Amadia have successively swept over it.." A new epoch began in the 17th century when Emir Afrasiyab of Basra allowed the Portuguese to build a church outside of the city.

Assyrian Genocide and post-World War era 

During World War I, the Assyrians of northern Iraq, southeastern Turkey, northeastern Syria and northwestern Iran suffered the Assyrian genocide, which accounted for the deaths of up to 65% of the entire Assyrian population. In the year of Iraq's formal independence, 1933, the Iraqi military carried out large-scale massacres against the Assyrians (Simele massacre) which had supported the British colonial administration before.

In the early 1930s, the Iraqi Arab ministries disseminated leaflets among the Kurds calling them to join them to massacre Assyrians. This call appealed to Islamic convictions and united Arabs and Kurds against the infidel Christians. Shortly before the August 11 Simele massacre in 1933, Kurds began a campaign of looting against Assyrian settlements. The Assyrians fled to Simele, where they were also persecuted. According to some studies, there were many accounts by witnesses of numerous atrocities perpetrated by Arabs and Kurds on Assyrian women.

In 1987, the last Iraqi census counted 1.4 million Christians. They were tolerated under the secular regime of Saddam Hussein, who even made one of them, Tariq Aziz, his deputy. However, persecution by Saddam Hussein continued against the Eastern Aramaic speaking Christians on an ethnic, cultural and racial level. The Neo-Aramaic language and writing was repressed, the giving of Syriac Christian names or Akkadian/Assyro-Babylonian names forbidden (Tariq Aziz's given name is Mikhail Yuhanna, for example), and Saddam exploited religious differences between Iraqi Christians' denominations such as the Chaldean Catholic Church, Syriac Orthodox Church, Assyrian Church of the East and Ancient Church of the East. Over 2,000 Iraqi Christians were ethnically cleansed from their towns and villages during the Anfal campaign of 1988.

Iraq War 

As of 21 June 2007, the UNHCR estimated that 2.2 million Iraqis had been displaced to neighboring countries and 2 million were displaced internally, with nearly 100,000 Iraqis fleeing to Syria and Jordan each month. Some of those refugees and IDPs were Christians. A 25 May 2007 article noted that in the previous seven months only 69 people from Iraq had been granted refugee status in the United States.

After the 2003 invasion of Iraq, violence against Christians rose, with reports of abduction, torture, bombings, and killings. Some Christians were pressured to convert to Islam under threat of death or expulsion, and women were ordered to wear Islamic dress.

In August 2004, International Christian Concern protested an attack by Islamists on Iraqi Christian churches that killed 11 people. In 2006, an Orthodox Christian priest, Boulos Iskander, was beheaded and mutilated despite payment of a ransom, and in 2008, the Assyrian clergyman Archbishop Paulos Faraj Rahho of the Chaldean Catholic Church in Mosul was killed after being abducted. In January 2008, bombs exploded outside nine churches.

In 2007, Chaldean Catholic priest Fr. Ragheed Aziz Ganni and subdeacons Basman Yousef Daud, Wahid Hanna Isho, and Gassan Isam Bidawed were killed in the ancient city of Mosul. Ganni was driving with his three deacons when they were stopped and demanded to convert to Islam, when they refused they were shot. Ganni was the pastor of the Chaldean Church of the Holy Spirit in Mosul and a graduate from the Pontifical University of Saint Thomas Aquinas, Angelicum in Rome in 2003 with a licentiate in ecumenical theology. Six months later, the body of Paulos Faraj Rahho, archbishop of Mosul, was found buried near Mosul. He was kidnapped on 29 February 2008 when his bodyguards and driver were killed.

In 2010, reports emerged in Mosul of people being stopped in the streets, asked for their identity cards, and shot if they had a first or last name indicating Assyrian or Christian origin. On 31 October 2010, 58 people, including 41 hostages and priests, were killed after an attack on an Assyrian Syriac Catholic church in Baghdad. A group affiliated to Al-Qaeda, the Islamic State of Iraq, stated that Iraq's indigenous Christians were a "legitimate target." In November, a series of bombings and mortar attacks targeted Christian Assyrian-majority areas of Baghdad.

2008-2017 instability and ISIS 

During the 2014 Northern Iraq offensive, the Islamic State issued a decree in July that all Christians in the area of its control must pay a special tax of approximately $470 per family, convert to Islam, or die. Many of them took refuge in nearby Kurdish-controlled regions of Iraq. Christian homes have been painted with the Arabic letter ن (nūn) for Nassarah (an Arabic word  that means "Christian") and a declaration that they are the property of the Islamic State. On 18 July, the Jihadists seemed to have changed their minds and announced that all Christians would need to leave or be killed. Most of those who left had their valuable possessions stolen. According to Chaldean Catholic Patriarch Louis Raphaël I Sako, there were no Christians remaining in Mosul in 2015, for the first time in the nation's history. But after Mosul’s liberation in 2017, Christian families began to return.

Current situation 

After the invasion of Iraq by the United States and its allies, many Iraqi Christians fled from Baghdad and other areas to the Kurdistan region. Most of them have arrived as internally displaced people. Christians who are too poor or unwilling to leave their ancient homeland have fled mainly to Erbil, particularly to its Christian suburb of Ankawa. 10,000 mainly Assyrian Iraqi Christians live in the UK, led by Archbishop Athanasios Dawood, who has called on the government to accept more refugees.

Apart from emigration, the Iraqi Christians are also declining due to lower rates of birth and higher death rates than their Muslim compatriots. Also since the invasion of Iraq, Assyrians and Armenians have been targeted by Islamist extremist organisations. Pope Francis paid Iraq an apostolic visit between the 5–8 March 2021, during which he visited the cities Najaf, Baghdad, Ur, Mosul, Qaraqosh and Erbil.

Relations with non-Christians 
From the late 13th century through to the present time, Christian Assyrians have suffered both religious and ethnic persecution, including a number of massacres and genocides.

Former Iraqi Foreign Minister Tariq Aziz's (birth name Michael Youkhanna) death sentence was not signed by the Iraqi president in 2010 because the president "sympathise[d] with Tariq Aziz because he is an Iraqi Christian." This also came after appeals from the Holy See not to carry out the sentence.

Persecutions 

Iraqi Christians have been victim of executions, forced displacement campaigns, torture, violence and target of Sunni Islamist groups like al-Qaeda and ISIS. Since the 2003 Iraq War, Iraqi Christians have fled from the country and their population has collapsed under the democratic government. Majority of Christians have either fled to Iraqi Kurdistan or abroad. A population project by the Shlama Foundation has estimated that there are about 150,000 Christian Assyrians remaining in Iraq as of July 2020. This is down from about 1,500,000 in the year 2003.

In 2003, Iraqi Christians were primary target of extremist Sunni Islamists. Many kidnapped Christians were forced to leave Christianity or tortured.

On August 1, 2004, a series of car bomb attacks took place during the Sunday evening Mass in churches of two Iraqi cities, Baghdad and Mosul, killing and wounding a large number of Christians. Jordanian-Iraqi Sunni Arab Abu Musab al-Zarqawi was blamed for the attacks.

In 2006, an Orthodox priest, Boulos Iskander, was snatched off the streets of Sunni city of Mosul by a Sunni group that demanded a ransom. His body was later found, the priest's arms and legs had also been cut off.

In 2007, there were reports of a push to drive Christians out of the historically Christian suburb of Dora in southern Baghdad, with some Muslim Arabs accusing the Christians of being allies of the Americans. A total number of 239 similar cases were registered by police between 2007 and 2009.

In 2008, a priest named Ragheed Ganni, was shot dead in his church along with three of his companions. At the same year, there were reports that Christian students are harassed.

In 2008, the charity Barnabas conducted research into 250 Iraqi Christian IDPs who had fled to the north of the country (Iraqi Kurdistan) to seek refugee status and found nearly half had witnessed attacks on churches or Christians, or been personally targeted by violence.

In 2009, the Kurdistan Regional Government (KRG) reported that more than 40,000 Christians had moved from Baghdad, Basra and Mosul to the Iraqi Kurdistan cities. The reports also stated that a number of Christians families who are moving to the Iraqi Kurdistan is growing and they were providing support and financial assistance for 11,000 of those families, and some are employed by the KRG.

In 2010, Sunni Islamist groups attacked a Syriac Catholic church in Baghdad during Sunday evening Mass, on 31 October 2010 killing more than 60 and wounding 78 Iraqi Christians.

In 2011, Sunni extremists assassinated a Christian randomly using sniper rifles. Two months before the incident, 2 Christians had been shot for unknown reasons in Baghdad and 2 other Christians had been shot by a Sunni jihadist in Mosul.

On 30 May 2011, a Christian man was beheaded by a Sunni man in Mosul.

On 2 August 2011, a Catholic church was bombed by Sunni extremists in Turkmen area of Kirkuk, wounding more than 23 Christians.

On 15 August 2011, a church was bombed by al-Qaeda in Kirkuk center.

On November 24, 2013 in Mosul, a Christian journalist was gunned down in a targeted attack.

On 25 December 2013 in Baghdad, Sunni extremists targeted a market in a Christian area, killing at least eleven patrons in two blasts.

On 25 December 2013 in Baghdad, over two dozen innocents outside a Catholic church were massacred by Sunni bombers.

In 2014, during the 2014 Northern Iraq offensive, the Islamic State of Iraq (ISIS) ordered all Christians in the area of its control, where the Iraqi Army collapsed, to pay a special tax of approximately $470 per family, convert to Sunni Islam, or die. Many of them took refuge in nearby Kurdish and Shia controlled regions of Iraq.

Kurdification  

Many Assyrians activists claim they have suffered not only from Arabization, but also Kurdification in Iraqi Kurdistan, mainly in KDP-controlled areas. Assyrian activists have claimed that the number of Christians live in Iraqi Kurdistan has declined. It is known that the Iraqi Kurdistan have accepted more than 200,000 Christians refugees and IDPs who had fled from other areas in Iraq between 2012 and 2016. It is also known that security officers and authorities who work for the Barzani tribe and his political party, the KDP, have frequently abused some local Christians and IDPs for not being loyal "enough" to them.

There have also been claims levied by Assyrian organizations that the Kurdistan Regional Government has hindered international aid from reaching Christian Assyrians and at times attempted to prevent Assyrian Aramaic schools. However, the annual report by the Kurdistan Regional Government (KRG) states that the KRG has rebuilt and renovated over 20 Christian churches in the region and reconstructed more than 105 Christian villages.

Additionally, several reports have been written about those Christians who do not get "political" representation and therefore do not succeed in expanding their schools, and are shut out from all but the most basic funding. This has been denied by Kurdish authorities. There are currently 5 Christians seated in the parliament of Iraqi Kurdistan. Assyrians who have arrived as internally displaced persons to the Iraqi Kurdistan have demanded more rights from the KRG and this has led to the serious disputes. In 2014, Assyrians International News Agency stated:
 Institutions and government agencies in the Iraqi Kurdistan Region use both languages. The Constitution also stipulates that Turkmen and Syriac are official languages in the administrative units where native speakers of these languages comprise a significant proportion of the population (a law has also included the Armenian language alongside Turkmen and Syriac). The Constitution notes that any region or province can adopt an additional language as a "local official language" if the majority of the region or province's residents agree to this in a general referendum.

Some have also complained that adults have to join the KDP party in the KDP-majority areas of Iraqi Kurdistan in order to be granted employment and that KDP representatives are allowed to settle in Assyrian villages. Some interviewed Christian IDPs had told that the Arabs, Kurds and Islamists are fully aware that Assyrians have no means of protection in the face of attacks. In 2005, the Department of State's 2005 Human Rights Country Report for Iraq stated in the January elections, there have been reports that many of the mostly non-Muslim residents of the Nineveh Plains were unable to vote and incidents of voter fraud  and intimidation occurred during the Iraq War. It was reported that Kurdish security forces also prevented ballot boxes to pass to some Christian villages fearing that they will support the central Iraqi government. Some cases of illegal land and property seizures of Christian Assyrian lands by KDP members were also claimed.

Michael Youash, an Assyrian expert, had stated in his report that the Iraqi Kurdistan government was unable to provide safe haven for all Christians. He explained this by saying that the KDP publicizes that tens of thousands of Christian Assyrian families are coming to the safety of the north (Kurdish areas) from Arab areas, but "hundreds of thousands" of Christians are leaving the country (Iraq) entirely. He claims that this is directly connected to the problems of "illegal land seizures".

There have been reports that Kurdish security forces have also committed abuses against some Christians in northern Iraq during the Iraq War of 2003. These included threats and intimidation to detentions and torture. In 1992, Assyrians who supported Iraqi dictator Saddam published a communiqué, which warned against the continuous process of Kurdification in northern Iraq which said: "The Kurdish leadership, and in a well-planned program, had begun to settle Kurds and in large numbers around Assyrian regions like Sarsank, Barwari Bala and others. They claimed that Kurdish housing project was natural to change the demographic, economic, and civic structure of the Christian regions in only few short years; a process that forced the Christians to emigrate as the vacant homes were overtaken by 'the Kurds'." Francis Yusuf Shabo was a Christian Assyrian politician who dealt with complaints by Christian Assyrians regarding villages from which they had been forcibly evicted during the Arabization and subsequently resettled by Arabs and Kurds.

Human Rights Watch reported that there have been disputes between some Kurds and minorities, including Christians about lands. The Kurdish victims of Saddam Hussein's genocidal campaign, who have returned to their villages, have had deep issues with local people (including Christian Assyrians) who they have accused of supporting Saddam's genocidal campaign against them during the Al-Anfal campaign. According to the HRW, minorities in those disputed villages have been victimized by Kurdish authorities’ heavy handed tactics, "including arbitrary arrests and detentions, and intimidation, directed at anyone resistant to Kurdish expansionist plans". These disputes have created an opening for Sunni Arab extremists, who continue their campaign of killing minorities, especially religious Christian minorities.

HRW reported that to consolidate their (Kurdish) grip on the Nineveh Plains area and to facilitate its incorporation into the Kurdistan Region, Kurdish authorities in the Nineveh Plains have embarked on a two-pronged strategy: they have offered minorities of the Nineveh Plains inducements while simultaneously wielding repression in order to keep them in tow. The goal of these tactics have been believed to be to push Shabak and Yazidi communities to identify as ethnic Kurds, and for Christians to abide by the Kurdish government's plan of securing a Kurdish victory in any referendum concerning the future of the disputed territories.

Kurdish authorities have tried to win favor with the minority communities by spending millions of Iraqi dinars to build a pro-Kurdish system of patronage in minority communities, making them wealthier, financing alternative civil society organizations to compete with, undermine, and challenge the authority of established groups, many of which oppose Kurdish rule. The KRG also funds private militias created ostensibly to protect minority communities from outside violence, in which Iraqi authorities have failed, but which mainly serve to entrench Kurdish influence. Finally, the Kurdish leadership has enriched the coffers of Christian and Yazidi religious leaders, and paid for expensive new places of worship in order to win over minority religious establishments.

In 2009, during the Iraq War, HRW stated that "KRG authorities have relied on intimidation, threats, and arbitrary arrests and detentions, more than actual violence, in their efforts to secure support of minority communities for their agenda regarding the disputed territories. A Chaldo-Assyrian leader described the Kurdish campaign to Human Rights Watch as “the overarching, omnipresent reach of a highly effective and authoritarian regime that has much of the population under control through fear.” 

During the 2011 Dohuk riots, a group of Kurdish radical Islamists attacked properties of Christian Assyrians, Yazidis and non-Muslim Kurds. Attackers were instigated by Friday prayers' sermons of radical clerics who had come from other parts of Iraq.

According to Youash Michael, Peshmerga forces controlled the security in the Nineveh Plains in 2008, allowing the KDP to deny the minorities of the Nineveh Plains a chance to express their will electorally. He also claimed that according to two refugees he interviewed, the "Kurds" had seized their lands and the Kurdistan Regional Government would not implement any decisions requiring the return of land to "original Assyrian inhabitants".

Demographics 

Iraq's ancient Christian community has more than halved in recent years, from an estimated population of 900,000. Since then, it has been estimated that the number of Christians in Iraq has dropped to 500,000+. However, due to a lack of an official census, the number is difficult to estimate.

The most widely followed denomination among Iraq Christians is the Chaldean Catholic Church, whose, despite the denominational name "Chaldean", are followers who are the same ethnic Assyrians as those of the Assyrian and Syriac churches. However, the Assyrian Church of the East of which the Chaldean Catholic Church is a 17th century off shoot, plays a bold role in the demographics. Before the advent of Islam, the majority of Iraqis (Mesopotamians) followed Syriac Christianity, Eastern Orthodoxy, Catholicism, Judaism or ancient Mesopotamian religions. There are about 60,000 Iraqi Armenians who follow either the Armenian Apostolic Church or the Armenian Catholic Church. There are also several thousand Arab Christians who are either Greek Orthodox or Melkite Catholic, and they are largely concentrated in Baghdad. Other Christians live primarily in Basra, Mosul, Erbil, and Kirkuk, as well as in the Assyrian homeland regions such as the Nineveh Plains, Duhok, and Zakho in the north.

Christian communities

Churches of the Syriac Rite 
The majority of the Iraqi Christians belong to the branches of Syriac Christianity, whose followers are mostly ethnic Assyrians adhering to both the East Syriac Rite and West Syriac Rite:
 Syriac Orthodox Church
 Assyrian Church of the East
 Ancient Church of the East
 Syriac Catholic Church
 Chaldean Catholic Church
 Assyrian Evangelical Church
 Assyrian Pentecostal Church

Churches of the Armenian rite 
Followers of these churches are exclusively ethnic Armenians, using Armenian Rite:
 Armenian Apostolic Church
 Armenian Catholic Church

Churches of the Byzantine rite 
Followers of these churches are an ethnic mix known as Melkites:
 Melkite Orthodox Church under the jurisdiction of the Archdiocese of Baghdad,
 Melkite Catholic Church under Patriarchal Exarchate of Iraq

Other churches and communities 
 Roman Catholic Church (Roman Rite)
 Protestant churches

Notable people 
 Tariq Aziz, Iraqi Assyrian Deputy Prime Minister (1979–2003) and Foreign Minister (1983–1991).
Bahnam Zaya Bulos, former Iraqi Assyrian Minister of Transport
Haitham Yousif, Iraqi Assyrian singer, referred to as "Prince of Love" in the Arab world
Seta Hagopian, renowned Iraqi Armenian singer, referred to as "Warm voice of Iraq" and the "Fairouz of Iraq"
Hunayn ibn Ishaq, 9th century Arab Nestorian Christian, a key and fundamental figure during the Arab Golden Age, which took place in Iraq, referred to as "Sheikh of the Translators", due to his work in translating Arabic, Syriac and Greek texts, native to Al-Hirah (Najaf)
Matthew the Hermit, Assyrian 4th century Christian saint
Ammar al-Basri, 9th century Arab Syriac theologian native to Basra
Simor Jalal, Iraqi Assyrian singer
Beatrice Ohanessian, Iraqi Armenian pianist
Yusuf Salman Yusuf, also referred to as "Comrade Fahd", Iraqi Assyrian, one of the founders and most influential figures of the Iraqi Communist Party
Albert Edward Ismail Yelda, Iraqi Assyrian activist and Iraq's Ambassador to the Vatican (2004)
Hormuzd Rassam, Iraqi Assyrian Assyriologist
Linda George, Iraqi Assyrian singer
Youra Eshaya, Iraqi Assyrian footballer
Nahren Anweya, Assyrian American Christian activist (1982–present) and was the first woman to leak the ISIS invasion against the Christians on national media.
Ammo Baba, Iraqi Assyrian footballer and coach.
Ayoub Odisho, Iraqi Assyrian footballer and coach. 
Justin Meram, Iraqi Chaldean/Assyrian footballer  
Mar Mari Emmanuel, Iraqi Australian Bishop of the Assyrian Church of the East

See also 
 Demographics of Iraq
 Religion in Iraq
 Freedom of religion in Iraq
 Arab Christians
 Assyrian people 
 Chaldean Catholics
 Assyrian Church of the East 
 Chaldean Catholic Church
 Syriac Catholic Church
 Syriac Orthodox Church
 Delegation Apostolic of Mesopotamia, Kurdistan, and Armenia
 Kurdish Christians
 Christian influences on the Islamic world
 Christianity and Islam
 Christianity in the Middle East
 Religion in the Middle East
 Persecution of Christians in Iraq
 List of monasteries in Iraq

Notes

References

Further reading

External links 
 Official Website of the Eastern Orthodox Archdiocese of Baghdad, Kuwait and Dependencies
 European Centre for Law and Justice (2011): The Persecution of Oriental Christians, what answer from Europe?